The Rail Clearways Programme was conceived in 2004 with the aim of easing congestion of Sydney's suburban railway network, by reducing the amount of infrastructure shared by multiple services. The disparate projects at pinch points throughout the network were designed to increase passenger capacity and improve reliability. All projects were delivered by the Transport Construction Authority until it was subsumed in November 2011 by Transport for New South Wales. A new timetable was introduced in October 2013 that realised the benefit of many of the projects, and by January 2014—the programme was complete.

Conception
In the mid-2000s, the Government of New South Wales suffered heavy criticism for its perceived mishandling of the Sydney rail network, which had very poor on-time performance following the January 2003 Waterfall train disaster. The safety regime introduced after this crash required drivers to stick to the speed limit, which often caused delays due to the expectations of the timetable for higher speeds. A slower timetable was introduced in September 2005, which significantly improving on-time running of services. The Clearways Programme was intended as the next step in improving the network.

Clearways routes
The Clearways Programme aimed to divide fourteen rail lines into five independent "clearways", reducing the heavily interwoven nature of the Sydney system. This was intended to isolate incidents to one part of the network so other lines would still run as scheduled. The "clearways" feed the existing lines through the Sydney Central Business District.

As the Carlingford Line does not run through the CBD, it was not included in a "clearway". Track upgrades to the Carlingford Line were still included in the programme, but this was cancelled in the November 2008 Mini-Budget. The Carlingford Line has since closed for Light Rail conversion.

The five clearways routes are:

Clearway 1: Eastern Suburbs & Illawarra
This route did not change from the pre-Clearways Eastern Suburbs & Illawarra Line. The projects undertaken on this route have increased passenger capacity.

Clearway 2: Bankstown
After the Airport Line opened in May 2000, most trains from the East Hills line used the new line to approach the city, easing congestion on the older line between Sydenham and Erskineville, where tracks are shared with Bankstown Line services. Under the programme, new dedicated tracks for the Bankstown Line between Sydenham and Erskineville were to be constructed to the west of the existing four tracks to allow express East Hills Line trains from Clearway 3 to again run via Sydenham. The Airport Line would be served by all-stops East Hills Line trains from Clearway 4.

St. Peters and Erskineville railway stations were expected to continue to be served by the Bankstown Line. This would have required platforms—partially completed in the 1970s from the Eastern Suburbs Line construction—to have been activated at these two stations. The works were cancelled in November 2008, and the plan for frequent operation of express East Hills Line services via Sydenham was abandoned.

A second Bankstown Line project involved the construction of a new turn-back platform at Lidcombe, separating the Bankstown Line's operations from the former Inner West Line (later part of the Airport, Inner West & South Line). This works in concert with the Homebush turn-back project, which provides a terminating point for all stations trains on the Airport, Inner West & South Line. This separation was enacted in the October 2013 timetable. The turn-back platform at Lidcombe was also marked in 2012 as a terminal for Sydney Metro Southwest, with original plans to convert the Bankstown Line through to Lidcombe and Cabramatta into rapid transit. This plan has since been altered to have Bankstown as the terminus of the Metro line.

Clearway 3: Campbelltown Express and Clearway 4: Airport & South
The Campbelltown Express Clearway would have separated the section of the East Hills Line west of Revesby by quadruplicating between Kingsgrove and Revesby and sending express trains to the City Circle via Sydenham. This was to allow more frequent express services to the city, relieve pressure on other parts of the network and improve the distribution of passengers.

On the Airport & South Clearway, express services would have begun at Glenfield and made their way through Liverpool, Cabramatta, Granville, Lidcombe and Strathfield stations to the City Circle, while all-stations services to the City started at Homebush. After passing through the City Circle, trains would have headed south-west via the Airport Line to Revesby (running parallel with the Campbelltown Express line from Wolli Creek to Revesby).

In the October 2013 timetable, these two clearways were merged to create the Airport, Inner West & South Line. Differences from the original plan include via-Revesby and via-Granville trains sharing tracks between Glenfield and Macarthur, and all-stations and express trains via-Revesby sharing tracks between Revesby and Central. Most trains from Macarthur via Revesby use the local (pre-existing) tracks between Revesby and Wolli Creek, and make a number of stops along the route. These trains approach the City via the Airport. The route via-Sydenham and the express tracks between Wolli Creek and Revesby are only used by a limited number of peak-hour services as well as NSW Trains services to Goulburn, Canberra, Griffith and Melbourne.

In the November 2017 timetable, in addition to peak-hour trains from Macarthur via Sydenham utilising the express tracks between Wolli Creek and Revesby, most Macarthur via Airport services throughout the day now operate via the express tracks, resulting in the full separation of Macarthur express trains from Revesby all-stations trains which continue to use the local tracks. This has resulted in the removal of express trains for Padstow and Riverwood as the express tracks are unable to serve those stations where there are no platforms.

Clearway 5: North West
The North West Clearway provides an independent corridor for the North Shore & Western Line and Northern Line to improve reliability and capacity. Trains from the west start from the Richmond, Penrith or Epping branches, meet up at Strathfield and travel through the city to Chatswood. Here trains used to split, either continuing up the North Shore Line to Berowra, or via the Chatswood to Epping Line to Hornsby, prior to its conversion to Sydney Metro Northwest in 2018.

Projects
Many infrastructure upgrades needed to be completed in order to implement the Clearways plan. These projects included upgrading stations, adding extra tracks, stabling facilities, or upgrading junctions.
The projects were:

[{
"type": "ExternalData",
"service": "page",
"title": "Sydney suburban passenger rail network (2009-15).map"
},
{
"type": "ExternalData",
"service": "page",
"title": "Rail Clearways program.map"
}]

Non-clearways projects
Other projects of the era which were not part of the Rail Clearways programme:
Epping to Chatswood railway line – opened February 2009
Southern Sydney Freight Line by the Australian Rail Track Corporation – gives freight services their own dedicated line through southern Sydney – opened January 2013
South West Rail Link – includes an additional platform at Glenfield and a flyover at Glenfield North Junction – opened February 2015
Northern Sydney Freight Corridor – a series of projects to increase capacity for freight services – completed June 2016

Resignalling:
Sefton – completed January 2006
Oatley – Cronulla – completed April 2010
North Sydney – St Leonards

Cancelled projects included:
Redfern to Chatswood line – announced in 2005, cancelled in 2008
CBD Relief Line – announced in 2010, cancelled in 2011

See also
 Transport in Sydney in the 2010s

References

External links
Flickr gallery showing construction of Rail Clearways projects

Rail infrastructure in New South Wales
Railway lines in Sydney
Sydney Trains